Reading Pride is an annual LGBT+ event held in Reading, Berkshire, England, that serves the lesbian, gay, bisexual and transgender communities of Reading and the Thames Valley.

History 

Reading Pride was formed in 2003.

2006 saw the introduction of a parade through Reading's main shopping streets to the festival site.

Since 2007, Pride has been a regular annual event at King's Meadow.

In 2008, there was an increase of more than 10,500 visitors which raised additional funds, to be used to provide support to a number of local charities and organisations such as BeYou, Gay Berkshire and Thames Valley Positive Support.

Since 2009, Reading Pride has added new attractions, including live performance stages, a VIP area, alternative performance enclosures, "chill-out" areas, a Youth Zone and Karaoke.

Aims of the Charity 
Reading Pride aims to promote equality and education in relation to Lesbian, Gay, Bisexual, Transgender and Asexual (LGBTA) people.

Reading Pride works for the community in Reading and around the Thames Valley. By staging an annual parade and festival the charity strives to raise awareness on issues affecting LGBTA persons.

Throughout the year the Reading Pride also supports other charitable and voluntary organisations within the community. In 2015 Reading Pride helped launch MyUmbrella, a Reading-based charity representing lesser-known LGBT+ identities.

The Parade 
The first Reading Pride parade was held in 2006 and was jointly organised by The Wynford Arms. The Wynford Arms made a Rainbow Flag for the parade participants to carry from The Wynford Arms to King's Meadow.

In the years since, the Reading Pride Parade has started from Civic Offices and the number of people taking part in the parade has grown year on year. In 2012 over 500 people participated.

 Regular Parade Route *
The Reading Pride Parade starts at 11am at the Civic Offices, travels along Broad Street, Market Place, Forbury Gardens and ends at King's Meadow around 12pm.

The Organisation 
Reading Pride was founded in 2003. It is a registered charity (number 1119891) run solely by volunteers, aiming to promote equality and diversity in relation to Lesbian, Gay, Bisexual, Transgender and Asexual (LGBTA) people in Reading and across the Thames Valley. Reading Pride is best known for the annual LGBTA Pride festival held every summer. 

Reading Pride volunteers work throughout the year to raise funds both for the annual Pride festival and for the community. The team also works to increase public awareness of other charitable and voluntary organisations in the local area that provide information, advice and support on a breadth of LGBTA issues.

Reading Pride Awards 
In 2009, Reading Pride introduced an award ceremony to thank the people that have made a difference to LGBT people in Reading and the Thames Valley.

The winners were:

 John Woods – Lifetime Achievement Award
 Dennis Hambridge – LGBT Campaigner Award
 SohoBoyz – LGBT Charity/Business Award
 Chris Gibbons / Stonewall – LGBT Impact Campaigner Award
 Simon Hallam & Sue Green – Community Campaigner Award

References

http://www.realpride.com/company/3266

http://www.activreading.com/community/detail/ReadingPrideRoyale-3402.html

External links
 Reading Pride website

Organizations established in 2003
Organisations based in Reading, Berkshire
Culture in Reading, Berkshire
Recurring events established in 2003
Pride parades in England